Zarichchia is the name of various places in Ukraine:

Villages 
 Zarichchia — Autonomous Republic of Crimea, Nyzhniohirskyi Raion
 Zarichchia — Cherkasy Oblast, Zvenyhorodka Raion
 Zarichchia — Chernihiv Oblast, Novhorod-Siverskyi Raion
 Zarichchia — Chernihiv Oblast, Koriukivka Raion
 Zarichchia — Chernivtsi Oblast, Vyzhnytsia Raion
 Zarichchia — Vinnytsia Oblast, Haisyn Raion
 Zarichchia — Volyn Oblast, Volodymyr Raion
 Zarichchia — Volyn Oblast, Kovel Raion
 Zarichchia — Volyn Oblast, Manevychi Raion
 Zarichchia — Dnipropetrovsk Oblast, Kamianske Raion
 Zarichchia — Zhytomyr Oblast, Korosten Raion
 Zarichchia — Zhytomyr Oblast, Ovruch Raion
 Zarichchia — Zhytomyr Oblast, Ruzhyn Raion
 Zarichchia — Zakarpattia Oblast, Irshava Raion
 Zarichchia — Ivano-Frankivsk Oblast, Kalush Raion
 Zarichchia — Ivano-Frankivsk Oblast, Nadvirna Raion, Deliatyn settlement hromada
 Zarichchia — Kyiv Oblast, Obukhiv Raion
 Zarichchia — Khmelnytskyi Oblast, Shepetivka Raion, Bilohiria settlement hromada
 Zarichchia — Khmelnytskyi Oblast, Shepetivka Raion, Iziaslav urban hromada
 Zarichchia — Kirovohrad Oblast, Novoukrainka Raion
 Zarichchia — Lviv Oblast, Sambir Raion, Biskovytsia rural hromada
 Zarichchia — Lviv Oblast, Sambir Raion, Borynia settlement hromada
 Zarichchia — Lviv Oblast, Sambir Raion, Khyriv urban hromada
 Zarichchia — Lviv Oblast, Sambir Raion, Voyutytsia Village Council
 Zarichchia — Lviv Oblast, Stryi Raion
 Zarichchia — Lviv Oblast, Yavoriv Raion, Mostyska urban hromada
 Zarichchia — Lviv Oblast, Yavoriv Raion, Sudova Vyshnia urban hromada
 Zarichchia — Poltava Oblast, Orzhytsia Raion
 Zarichchia — Poltava Oblast, Pyriatyn Raion
 Zarichchia — Sumy Oblast, Krolevets Raion
 Zarichchia — Sumy Oblast, Romny Raion
 Zarichchia — Sumy Oblast, Seredyna-Buda Raion

 Zarichchia — former village of Bilohirsk Raion of the Autonomous Republic of Crimea, deregistered on March 22, 2007
Zarichchia — village of Zolochiv Raion of Lviv Oblast, attached to the city of Zolochiv
 Zarichchia — village of Lviv Raion of Lviv Oblast, attached to the urban-type settlement of Shchyrets
 Zarichchia — the village of Bilhorod-Dnistrovskyi Raion of Odesa Oblast, attached to the village of Velykomarianivka
 Zarichchia — former village of Trokhimivska village council of Ivanivka Raion of Kherson Oblast, deregistered
 Zarichchia — the village was annexed to the town of Proskurov on June 1, 1946 (since 1954 - Khmelnytskyi), now - the exhibition raion
 Zarichchia — former village of Bohorodchany Raion of Stanislav Oblast, attached to the village of Stari Bohorodchany

Other 
 Zarichchia —general zoological reserve in the town of Horodyshche, Cherkasy Oblast
 Zarichchia — forest reserve in the Volyn Oblast
 Zarichchia — park in Khmelnytskyi
 Zarichchia — protected tract in the Ivano-Frankivsk Oblast
 Zarichchia — area in the city of Zhmerynka, Vinnytsia Oblast
 Zarichchia — area in the city of Fastiv, Kyiv Oblast

See also 
 Zarzecze (disambiguation)

uk:Заріччя#Україна